The Armenian Catholic Eparchy of San Gregorio de Narek en Buenos Aires in an eparchy (Eastern Catholic diocese) of the Armenian Catholic Church (Armenian Rite in Armenian language) for Argentina.

It depends immediately on the Armenian Catholic Patriarch of Cilicia, without being part of his or any other ecclesiastical province.

Its Cathedral episcopal see is the Marian Catedral Armenia de Nuestra Señora de Narek, in Argentina's capital Buenos Aires, dedicated to Our Lady of Nareg.

History 
Established on 18 February 1989 as Eparchy of San Gregorio de Narek en (i.e. 'in') Buenos Aires, on territory split off from the Armenian Catholic Apostolic Exarchate of Latin America and Mexico, from where the Apostolic Exarch was promoted as first Eparch in Buenos Aires.

Bishops

Episcopal ordinaries
(all Armenian Rite)

Eparchial Bishops of (San Gregorio de Narek in) Buenos Aires
 Vartán Waldir Boghossian, S.D.B. (1989.02.18 – 2018.07.04), but temporarily Procurator at Rome of the Armenian Catholics (2001–2002); previously Titular Bishop of Mardin of the Armenians (1981.07.03 – 1989.02.18) & Apostolic Exarch of América Latina e México of the Armenians (Brazil) (1981.07.03 – 2018.07.04.)
 Pablo Hakimian (since 4 July 2018), also Apostolic Exarch of Armenian Catholic Apostolic Exarchate of Latin America and Mexico

Auxiliary bishop
Joseph Arnaouti, I.C.P.B. (1994-1997), appointed Curial Bishop of Cilicia (Armenian), Lebanon

See also 
 Catholic Church in Argentina

References

External links 
 GCatholic 
 Catholic-hierarchy.org

Armenian Catholic eparchies
Armenian Catholic Church in Argentina